Albert Michiels (born 29 June 1931) is a Belgian wrestler. He competed at the 1960 Summer Olympics and the 1964 Summer Olympics.

References

External links
 

1931 births
Possibly living people
Belgian male sport wrestlers
Olympic wrestlers of Belgium
Wrestlers at the 1960 Summer Olympics
Wrestlers at the 1964 Summer Olympics
Sportspeople from Antwerp
20th-century Belgian people